Akbar Ali Khan may refer to:

Akbar Ali Khan (politician) (1899–1994), former governor of Uttar Pradesh (India) and member of the Rajya Sabha 
Akbar Ali Khan (economist) (born 1944), Bangladeshi economist 
Albar Ali Khan (umpire) (born 20 March 1973), Emirati cricket umpire

See also
A. A. Khan (disambiguation)
Ali Akbar Khan (disambiguation)